Black River is a 1993 Australian film directed and produced by Kevin Lucas and starring Aboriginal mezzo-soprano Maroochy Barambah. It is a film adaptation of an opera that tells the story of an Aboriginal death in custody and its consequences. It was nominated for the 1993 Australian Film Institute Award for Award Best Screenplay and won the 1994 Montréal International Festival of Films on Art Jury Prize for Adapted Screenplay of the Year.

External links

 Black River at the National Film and Sound Archive

1993 films
Australian action films
1993 action films
1990s English-language films
1990s Australian films
Films about Aboriginal Australians